Aintzane Encinas Gómez is a retired Spanish football striker.

Career
After playing one first season at Añorga, Encinas joined Real Sociedad, where she played 13 seasons, most of them in Primera División, before retiring. She writes a column on the team's games for Marca.

International career
As an Under-19 international she took part in the 2004 U-19 World Championship.

References

1988 births
Living people
Spanish women's footballers
Footballers from San Sebastián
Primera División (women) players
Añorga KKE players
Real Sociedad (women) players
Women's association football forwards
Spain women's youth international footballers